Duke Paul Frederick of Mecklenburg (19 September 1852 – 17 May 1923) was a member of the House of Mecklenburg-Schwerin and general of the Mecklenburg cavalry.

Life
Duke Paul Frederick was born in Ludwigslust Castle as the second eldest son of Frederick Francis II, Grand Duke of Mecklenburg-Schwerin and his first wife Princess Augusta Reuss of Köstritz, the daughter of Prince Henry LXIII Reuss of Köstritz.

Duke Paul Frederick married in Schwerin on 5 May 1881 his cousin, the Austrian born Princess Marie of Windisch-Graetz, the daughter of Prince Hugo of Windisch-Graetz and his wife Duchess Louise of Mecklenburg-Schwerin. The couple who had five children who were all raised Roman Catholic, the religion of Princess Marie, lived a quiet life in Venice. While in Venice the family befriended Cardinal Sarto (later Pope Pius X) who often visited the family and acted as a spiritual advisor for them.

On 21 April 1884 Duke Paul Frederick renounced his and his sons rights of succession to Mecklenburg-Schwerin in favour of his younger brothers and their sons, so they would take precedence over him and his.  In 1887, Duke Paul Fredrick raised a Lutheran decided to convert to Roman Catholicism the religion of his wife and children.

In 1906 after upsetting his nephew Frederick Francis IV, Grand Duke of Mecklenburg-Schwerin, over the amount of money that he was spending Duke Paul Frederick and his wife were ordered to submit to the controller of the royal household.

Duke Paul Frederick died in Ludwigslust, where he and his wife are both buried in the Louisenkapelle.

Issue
 HH Duke Paul Friedrich of Mecklenburg (1882–1904)
 HH Duchess Maria Luise of Mecklenburg (1883–1883)
 HH Duchess Marie Antoinette of Mecklenburg (1884–1944)
 HH Duke Henry Borwin of Mecklenburg (1885–1942). Although his father had renounced his dynastic obligations, his right to marry a spouse of his choice (or a commoner) was not recognized and his two first marriages were unlawful (with no right to share his title) in Mecklenburg and the last one considered morganatic:
1. Elizabeth Tibbits Pratt (1860–1928), widow of Amédée De Gasquet-James of New Orleans; married in Dover, on June 15, 1911 and divorced in April 1913;
2. Natalie Oelrichs (1880–1931), widow of polo player Peter D. Martin of San Francisco, daughter of Charles May Oelrichs and sister of Blanche Oelrichs; married in 1915 and divorced in 1921. She was also known as the Duchess of Stargard.
3. Carola von Alers (1882–1974), daughter of Wilhelm von Alers and Adelaide von Chamisso de Boncourt; married in 1921.
 HH Duke Joseph of Mecklenburg (1889–1889)

Title, style and honours

Title & style 
 19 September 1852 – 17 May 1923: His Highness Duke Paul Frederick of Mecklenburg

Honours 
German decorations

Foreign decorations
 : Grand Cross of St. Stephen, 1915
 : Knight of the Elephant, 3 August 1904
 : Grand Cross of the Order of Prince Danilo I
 :
 Grand Cordon of the Order of Glory
 Order of Osmanieh, 1st Class
 : Grand Cross of the Tower and Sword, with Collar
 :
 Knight of St. Andrew
 Knight of St. Alexander Nevsky
 Knight of the White Eagle
 Knight of St. Anna, 1st Class
 Knight of St. Stanislaus, 1st Class
 Knight of St. George, 4th Class

Ancestry

References

1852 births
1923 deaths
Dukes of Mecklenburg-Schwerin
House of Mecklenburg-Schwerin
Converts to Roman Catholicism from Lutheranism
People from Ludwigslust
Recipients of the Iron Cross, 2nd class
Recipients of the Order of the White Eagle (Russia)
Recipients of the Order of St. Anna, 1st class
Recipients of the Order of St. George of the Fourth Degree
Grand Crosses of the Order of Saint Stephen of Hungary
Sons of monarchs